Harbhagat Singh a.k.a. Than Singh was an Indian politician from the state of the Madhya Pradesh. He represented Sihora Vidhan Sabha constituency of undivided Madhya Pradesh Legislative Assembly by winning General election of 1957. He studied in Col. Brown Cambridge School and St. Stephen's College.

References 

Year of birth missing
Possibly living people
Madhya Pradesh MLAs 1957–1962
People from Jabalpur district
Indian National Congress politicians from Madhya Pradesh